Comamonas composti is an aerobic, Gram-negative, rod-shaped, non-spore-forming, weak oxidase-positive, catalase-positive, motile bacterium from the genus Comamonas and family Comamonadaceae, which was isolated from food waste compost.

References

External links
Type strain of Comamonas composti at BacDive -  the Bacterial Diversity Metadatabase

Comamonadaceae
Bacteria described in 2008